The obscure berrypecker (Melanocharis arfakiana) is a small passerine bird from the berrypecker family Melanocharitidae. It was described by the German ornithologist Friedrich Finsch based on a specimen collected on the island of New Guinea (to which the berrypecker family is endemic); collected in 1867 in the Arfak Mountains (now in Papua). Another specimen was collected in 1933 in the mountains (950–1000 m) northwest of Port Moresby in Papua New Guinea (BirdLife International 2006), these two specimens are the only confirmed records of the species. Unconfirmed sight records have been made in regions of New Guinea; these suggest that the species is not rare, and is a resident of disturbed forest, able to cope with human modification of its habitat. All these sightings were all made in the mountains (640-1,100 m), which is consistent with the range of the rest of the berrypeckers, only the black berrypecker has a lowland range (Beeher et al. 1986).

Description
The obscure berrypecker is a drab olive coloured bird with a greyish wash on its upperparts. The species is arboreal (Gregory & Webster 2004) and probably is a solitary forager of fruit and small invertebrates obtained by hover-gleaning (like the rest of the berrypeckers).

References 

 Beehler, B., Pratt, T. & Zimmerman, D. (1986) Birds of New Guinea Princeton University Press:Princeton, 
 Gregory, P. & Webster, R. (2004) Papua New Guinea 2004 Field Guide Triplist. Downloaded on 11/9/2006

External links 
 BirdLife Species Factsheet

obscure berrypecker
Birds of New Guinea
obscure berrypecker
obscure berrypecker